Marco Polo di Suvero (born September 18, 1933, in Shanghai, China), better known as Mark di Suvero, is an abstract expressionist sculptor and 2010 National Medal of Arts recipient.

Biography

Early life and education
Marco Polo di Suvero was born to Matilde Millo di Suvero and Vittorio di Suvero (later known as Victor E.), both Italians of Sephardic Jewish descent. Di Suvero was one of four children, the eldest being Victor di Suvero. His father was a naval attaché for the Italian government and the family resided in Shanghai until his father was relocated to Tientsin shortly after the birth of the family's last son in 1936.

With the outbreak of World War II, di Suvero immigrated to San Francisco, California with his family in February 1941 aboard the S.S. President Cleveland.

Di Suvero attended City College of San Francisco from 1953 to 1954, followed by the University of California, Santa Barbara from 1954 to 1955. He began creating sculptures while at UCSB after reflecting that he couldn't make an original contribution in his philosophy major. Under the guidance of Robert Thomas, who allowed di Suvero to take his sculpting course, his work began to flourish. He transferred to the University of California, Berkeley and graduated with a B.A. in philosophy in 1957.

Career
After graduating from college, di Suvero moved to New York City in 1957 to pursue a sculpting art career. He worked part-time in construction and began to incorporate wood and metal from demolition sites into his work.

Mark di Suvero gained an almost instant recognition among art critics with his first solo exhibit at the Green Gallery in the fall of 1960. Arts Magazine'''s editor wrote «From now on nothing will be the same. One felt this at di Suvero's show. Here was a body of work at once so ambitious and intelligent, so raw and clean, so noble and accessible, that It must permanently alter our standards of artistic effort.»

Shortly thereafter, he was involved in a near-fatal elevator accident on March 26, 1960, while working at a construction site. He had a broken back and severe spinal injures; doctors believed he wouldn't be able to walk again. While in rehabilitation, he learned to work with an arc welder which became critical for later pieces. He made a recovery in four years and could walk without assistance by 1965. He is one of the sixteen artists included in the book Chronicles of Courage: Very Special Artists as a result of this accident and the subsequent effect it had upon his health.

Di Suvero was a founding member of the Park Place Gallery in 1963 with Forrest Myers, Leo Valledor, Peter Forakis, among others, until the Gallery's closure on July 31, 1967.

Di Suvero protested the Vietnam War, for which he was twice arrested, before he left the United States in 1971. During his four-year self-exile, he exhibited his works in the Netherlands and Germany, taught at the Università Internazionale dell'Arte, and lived in Chalon-sur-Saône, France where he maintained one of his studios on a barge until 1989. His French barge, Rêve de signes, has since been turned into La Vie des Formes, an atelier for emerging artists, which has been moored at Montceau-les-Mines since 2009.

In 1975, his sculptures were exhibited in the Tuileries Garden in Paris, the first living artist to hold an exhibition there. He later returned to the United States and opened a studio in Petaluma, California in 1975. While the Petaluma studio is still active, di Suvero moved to New York City and opened a studio there.

In 1976, the Whitney Museum of American Art housed a retrospective exhibition of di Suvero's smaller structures, while the city of New York exhibited some of his larger sculptures all around town. His 1966 sculpture, Praise for Elohim Adonai, was erected in front of the Seagram Building.

He founded the Athena Foundation in 1977 and Socrates Sculpture Park in 1986, both of which function to assist artists. In 2019, his tallest piece, E=MC 2, was moved from France to the Storm King Art Center in upstate New York.Gabriella Angeleti, Storm King installs sky-high sculpture by Mark di Suvero, Theartnewspaper.com, 17 July 2019

Personal life
Di Suvero currently lives in the Astoria, Queens neighborhood of New York City with his second wife, Kate D. Levin, whom he married in 1993, and daughter. Levin, a former City College of New York teacher, served as Commissioner of the New York City Department of Cultural Affairs from 2002 to 2013, and has worked under the Ed Koch and Michael Bloomberg administrations. Di Suvero was previously married to architect Maria Teresa Caparrotta, whom he met while living in Italy, but later divorced.

Art

His early works were large outdoor pieces that incorporated wooden timbers from demolition buildings, tires, scrap metal, and structural steel. This exploration has transformed over time into a focus on H-beams and heavy steel plates. Many of the pieces contain sections that are allowed to swing and rotate giving the overall forms a considerable degree of motion. He prides himself on his hands-on approach to the fabrication and installation of his work. Di Suvero pioneered the use of a crane as a sculptor's working tool.

His style is associated with the abstract expressionism movement but directly evokes the spirit of the Russian post-revolution constructivism. Constructivism is strongly associated with concepts of a utopian socialist reconstruction but came crashing down when the Stalin and Hitler empires failed. Di Suvero is the first artist post-war to revive the constructivist movement. The sculptures can be touched, and they are resistant enough to be climbed on.

Some of his work includes:
 Pre-Columbian (1964), acquired by the Fine Arts Museums of San Francisco in 2000
 Bunyon's Chess (1965) (Olympic Sculpture Park)
 Poland (1966)
 Are Years What? (for Marianne Moore) (1967)
 Snowplow (1968)
 Victor's Lament (1969-1970)
 The Lovers (1971-1973)
 For Handel (1975), Western Washington University, Bellingham, Washington
 The Calling (1981-1982)Shoshone (1982), public art sculpture, Los Angeles, California
 Iroquois (1983)
 Aurora (1992-1993), purchased by the National Gallery of Art from the Gagosian Gallery (NY) in 1996
 E=MC 2 (1992-1993), moved from France to the Storm King Art Center in upstate New York in 2019, the artist's largest piece so far.
 Galileo (1996), acquired by the Daimler Art Collection in 1998
 Joie de Vivre (1998)
 Pax Jerusalemme (1998-1999), Legion of Honor, San Francisco
 The Sieve of Eratosthenes (1999), Stanford UniversityDeclaration (2001), public art sculpture (originally temporary, considered permanent as of 2020), Venice Beach, Los Angeles, CaliforniaOrion (2006), arriving at the University of Michigan Museum of Art in 2008 as a long-term loan and purchased in 2019
 Clock Knot (2007)
 Paintbrush (2009), located on the Pratt Institute campus. 

Di Suvero's sculptures and career were the subjects of the 1977 film, North Star: Mark di Suvero. The film was produced by François De Menil and by art historian Barbara Rose, and it featured music composed by Philip Glass. The film was released as a DVD in 2012.

In May 2013, some of his most famous sculptures were exhibited in the Crissy Field park of San Francisco.

Critics
Some critics deny the novelty of di Suvero's art, arguing he just inflated an established concept to greater dimensions. In 1975, William Rubin argued he merely vulgarized the style of abstract expressionism set forth by Willem de Kooning and Franz Kline. When Pax Jerusalemme was installed in a prominent spot in front of the Legion of Honor in 2000, Kenneth Baker in the San Francisco Chronicle dismissed it as "mediocre." But remarking on the installation of the artist's colossal E=MC 2 at the Storm King Art Center, Jason Farago in the New York Times'' wrote that di Suvero "understands better than almost any artist the distinction between size and scale—and this serene work, breathing easy in Storm King's largest field, feels as approachable as a family member."

Honors and awards
2000: International Sculpture Center's Lifetime Achievement in Contemporary Sculpture Award
2005: Winner in the Arts and Humanities category at the 11th Annual Heinz Awards, which came with a $250,000 prize.
2010:
Medal of the Archives of American Art by the Smithsonian Institution
Winner of the National Medal of Arts, presented on March 2, 2011, by President Barack Obama.
2013: American Academy of Arts and Letters Gold Medal

See also
Park Place Gallery
John Raymond Henry
Abstract expressionism

References

External links

 National Medal of Arts biography
 The Heinz Awards biography
 ISC Lifetime Achievement Award
 Mark di Suvero and di Suvero family papers, 1934-2005, at the Smithsonian Archives of American Art
 Socrates Sculpture Park website
 Patients' Stories. Mark Di Suvero.

1933 births
Living people
University of California, Santa Barbara alumni
University of California, Berkeley alumni
United States National Medal of Arts recipients
Artists with disabilities
American male sculptors
20th-century American sculptors
21st-century American sculptors
21st-century American male artists
Artists from Shanghai
Artists from San Francisco
Sculptors from California
Italian emigrants to the United States
City College of San Francisco alumni
People from Petaluma, California
20th-century American male artists